Palfuria is a spider genus of the family Zodariidae of which nine species from Africa have been described to date.

Distribution
Five species (P. retusa, P. spirembolus, P. gladiator, P. panner, P. harpago) are known from the southwestern part of the continent, the other species (P. gibbosa, P. helichrysorum, P. hirsuta, P. caputlari) from the eastern part. The last species is from as far north as northern Tanzania. As in many other genera, there is a tendency for the embolus to increase in length. Both the most basal (Palfuria panner) and the most derived species (Palfuria spirembolus) are found in Namibia.

Species
 Palfuria caputlari Szüts & Jocqué, 2001 (Tanzania)
 Palfuria gibbosa (Lessert, 1936) (Mozambique)
 Palfuria gladiator Szüts & Jocqué, 2001 (Namibia)
 Palfuria harpago Szüts & Jocqué, 2001 (Namibia)
 Palfuria helichrysorum Szüts & Jocqué, 2001 (Malawi)
 Palfuria hirsuta Szüts & Jocqué, 2001 Zambia)
 Palfuria panner Jocqué, 1991 (Namibia)
 Palfuria retusa Simon, 1910 (South Africa)
 Palfuria spirembolus Szüts & Jocqué, 2001 (Namibia)

References
 Szüts, T. & Jocqué, R. (2001). A revision of the Afrotropical spider genus Palfuria (Araneae, Zodariidae). Journal of Arachnology 29(2):205–219. PDF

Zodariidae
Spiders of Africa
Araneomorphae genera